Ricardo Jérez (born 6 August 1956) is a Guatemalan footballer. He competed in the men's tournament at the 1988 Summer Olympics. Jérez was a member of the Guatemalan team that won a bronze medal at the 1983 Pan American Games.

References

External links
 

1956 births
Living people
Guatemalan footballers
Guatemala international footballers
Pan American Games medalists in football
Pan American Games bronze medalists for Guatemala
Footballers at the 1983 Pan American Games
Olympic footballers of Guatemala
Footballers at the 1988 Summer Olympics
Comunicaciones F.C. players
Association football goalkeepers
Place of birth missing (living people)
Medalists at the 1983 Pan American Games
20th-century Guatemalan people
21st-century Guatemalan people